The 1975 Colorado State Rams football team was an American football team that represented Colorado State University in the Western Athletic Conference (WAC) during the 1975 NCAA Division I football season. In its second season under head coach Sark Arslanian, the team compiled a 6–5 record (4–2 against WAC opponents). Colorado State's senior quarterback, Mark Driscoll, passed for 1,246 yards and 4 touchdowns.

Schedule

Roster

Team players in the NFL

References

Colorado State
Colorado State Rams football seasons
Colorado State Rams football